Thomas Nixon may refer to:

 Thomas Nixon (writer) (born 1961), American author and educator
 Thomas Nixon (cricketer, born 1815) (1815–1877), English cricketer and inventor
 Thomas Nixon (cricketer, born 1843) (1843–1907), English cricketer and umpire
 Tom Nixon (1931–2003), English footballer

See also
 Thomas Nixon Carver (1865–1961), American economics professor